The 1997 World Juniors Track Cycling Championships were the 23rd annual Junior World Championships for track cycling held at the Bellville Velodrome in Cape Town, South Africa in August 1997.

The Championships had five events for men (Sprint, Points race, Individual pursuit, Team pursuit and 1 kilometre time trial) and two for women (Individual pursuit and Sprint).

Events

Medal table

References

UCI Juniors Track World Championships
1997 in track cycling
1997 in South African sport